...A Nice Time 4 Lovin' is the first of series of compilation albums from the popular late-eighties soul trio Surface. The trio ran out of steam in the early '90s, and Columbia Records opted to regroup and salvage what they could from this greatest hits collection. The compilation was released on July 14, 1998 year and distributed for Japanese market only.

Track listing

Personnel

Surface
Bernard Jackson: Lead & Backing Vocal, Electric & Acoustic Guitars, Bass, Rapping
David Townsend: Electric & Acoustic Guitars, Synthesizers, Electric Piano, Drum Programming, Vocal Backing
David "Pic" Conley: Saxophone, Synthesized Bass, Drum Programming, Percussion, Flute, Orchestral Hits, Vocal Backing

References

[ Allmusic]
Discogs

External links
 
 ...A Nice Time 4 Lovin' at Discogs
 Facebook Page
 Soulwalking page
 Bio at R&B Haven
 Bio at AllThingsDeep

Columbia Records compilation albums
1991 greatest hits albums
Surface (band) albums